Der Blindgänger or The Dud is a short film by Andreas Samland released in 2004.

Plot
A public garden colony will be demolished to make way for a superhighway. But when the excavators find a bomb (unexploded ordnance, the 'dud' bomb in the title), on the land of old man Kupke, he threatens to detonate it: "the garden colony must stay!" The tenant of the neighbouring plot, an anarchic punk named Kanzler, joins in the fight: he demands a memorial for Germany's famous student leader Rudi Dutschke. The two very different men grow closer.

Awards
 Best Short 2004 - Brooklyn International Film Festival

See also
 Tag 26
 Red Gourmet Pellzik

References
Der Blindgänger at the Brooklyn International Film Festival

External links 
 

2004 films
German comedy short films
2004 short films
2000s German films